Tyke Nunatak is the smallest and northernmost of the Bates Nunataks at the west end of Britannia Range. So named because of its small size in relation to the two southern nunataks in the group.

Nunataks of George V Land